Sascha Maassen (born 28 September 1969 in Aachen, Germany) is a veteran sports car driver.

Early career
Maassen began his career in karts, and moved to cars in 1989, in Formula Ford 1600. During the early 1990s, he raced in the German Formula 3 series. His F3 career includes a win at the prestigious Macau Grand Prix in 1994. From 1995 to 1997, he raced touring cars for Nissan in the Super Tourenwagen Cup.

Sports car career
In 1998, Maassen moved to the FIA GT Championship, where he raced a Porsche 911 GT2 for Roock Racing, along with Bruno Eichmann. In 1999, he competed in Porsche Supercup. He also drove for Alex Job Racing at Petit Le Mans, where he won the GT class with Cort Wagner and Dirk Müller.

2000
In 2000, he joined Porsche as a factory driver. His primary job was driving a Porsche GT3-R in the American Le Mans Series. He partnered with fellow factory driver Bob Wollek at Dick Barbour Racing. The duo would win five races, including Maassen's second straight Petit Le Mans victory. He also finished 2nd in the GT class at the 24 Hours of Le Mans, driving for Skea Racing International. Maassen also raced sparingly in Supercup, and raced in the 24 Hours Nürburgring, and one race in the Sports Racing World Cup.

2001
In 2001, Maassen was paired with Lucas Luhr at Alex Job Racing. They would win at Texas and the 12 Hours of Sebring in the GT class in a season otherwise dominated by the BMW M3 GTRs. Maassen also raced prototypes, at the 24 Hours of Daytona for Champion Racing, and for Dick Barbour Racing at Le Mans.

2002
Maassen started 2002 by finishing 4th at the 24 Hours of Daytona for Champion Racing. Maassen and Luhr dominated the GT class of the ALMS, winning seven of ten races en route to the championship. These victories included second straight Sebring win, and 3rd career Petit Le Mans win.

2003
2003 saw Maassen and Luhr win the championship again, and win Sebring for the third year in a row. Maassen also notched his 20th class win in the ALMS at Miami. He also won the Grand-Am round at Circuit Mont-Tremblant in a Brumos Racing Fabcar-Porsche.

2004 & 2005
In 2004, Maassen acted mainly as a third driver for the longer endurance races, winning at Sebring and Petit Le Mans for Alex Job, and winning the GT class at Le Mans with Petersen Motorsports. 2005 saw him focus mainly on the development of the new Porsche RS Spyder, including racing in the car's debut at Laguna Seca.

2006
In 2006, Maassen would race the RS Spyder and win the LMP2 championship with Lucas Luhr. Maassen and Luhr would drive together for the first six races of the season, including one win (at Miller Motorsports Park) and an overall 2nd place (at Mid-Ohio). Maassen the partnered with Timo Bernhard for the remainder of the season, collecting two wins.

2007
Maassen continued driving for Penske in the ALMS

2008
Maassen continued driving for Penske in the ALMS, and competed in the 2008 edition of 24 hour Le Mans with Team Essex where he finished second in the LMP2 class together with John Nielsen and Casper Elgaard.

24 Hours of Le Mans results

Accolades
ALMS GT class champion: 2002, 2003
ALMS LMP2 class champion: 2006
24 Hours of Le Mans GT class winner: 2003, 2004
12 Hours of Sebring GT class winner: 2001, 2002, 2003, 2004
FIA GT Championship NGT Class Champion (with Lucas Luhr): 2004
Petit Le Mans LMP2 class winner: 2006
Petit Le Mans GT class winner: 1999, 2000, 2002, 2004
Macau Grand Prix winner: 1994

External links
Official website

1969 births
Living people
German racing drivers
German Formula Three Championship drivers
British Formula 3000 Championship drivers
Sportspeople from Aachen
24 Hours of Le Mans drivers
24 Hours of Daytona drivers
FIA GT Championship drivers
American Le Mans Series drivers
European Le Mans Series drivers
Racing drivers from North Rhine-Westphalia
Rolex Sports Car Series drivers
Porsche Supercup drivers
24 Hours of Spa drivers
Porsche Carrera Cup GB drivers
Carlin racing drivers
Team Penske drivers
Porsche Motorsports drivers
RSM Marko drivers
Cheever Racing drivers
Paul Stewart Racing drivers
Level 5 Motorsports drivers
Team Rosberg drivers
Porsche Carrera Cup Germany drivers